Henry Sargant Storer (13 February 1796, Clerkenwell – 8 January 1837, London) was a British artist and engraver. He was the son of James Sargant Storer, and exhibited drawings at the Royal Academy from 1814 to 1836.

List of works 

 The Cathedrals of Great Britain, 4 vols., 1814–1819
 Delineations of Fountains Abbey, 1820
 Delineations of Trinity College, Cambridge, c. 1820
 Views in Edinburgh and its Vicinity, 1820
 The University and City of Oxford displayed, 1821
 Delineations of Gloucestershire, 1824
 The Portfolio: a collection of Engravings from Antiquarian, Architectural, and Topographical Subjects, 4 vols., 1823–24. 
 Thomas Kitson Cromwell's History of Clerkenwell, 1828
 Walks through Islington, 1835
 The plates to Pierce Egan's Walks through Bath, 1819
 A view of Christ's College, Cambridge for the Cambridge Almanack, 1822.

References

Attribution

1796 births
1837 deaths
English engravers